Luhe or Lühe may refer to:

People

 Margrethe von der Lühe (1741–1826), Danish courtier; Mistress of the Robes to the Danish queen and the queen dowager
 Zhu Lühe (1877–1945), politician and judicial officer in the Republic of China

China
Luhe County (陆河县), Shanwei, Guangdong
Luhe District (六合区), Nanjing, Jiangsu
Luhe, Heilongjiang (芦河镇), town in Qinggang County
Luhe, Puyang County (鲁河镇), town in Henan
Luhe Township, Gansu (卢河乡), in Xihe County
Luhe Township, Heilongjiang (鲁河乡), in Longjiang County
Luhe Township, Jiangsu (鲁河乡), in Guanyun County
Luhe Township, Shangqiu (路河乡), in Suiyang District, Shangqiu, Henan
Lühe Township (吕河乡), Zhengyang County, Henan

Germany
Luhe (Ilmenau), a river that runs through the Lüneburg Heath in northern Germany
Luhe (Naab), a river that runs through the Upper Palatine Forest in Bavaria
Lühe, a Samtgemeinde ("collective municipality") west of Hamburg
Lühe (river), a river that runs through Altes Land and debouches in the Elbe 
Luhe-Wildenau, a municipality in the district of Neustadt, Bavaria